ATV is a Pakistani General Entertainment Channel which airs acquired serials from other channels like A Plus and PTV Home. It also shows kids programs as well as talk shows and Morning Show.

Shalimar Recording & Broadcasting Company Limited (SRBC) is an un-listed public Company, incorporated in Pakistan in December, 1974 under the Company's Act-1913 (Now the Companies Act-2017) and is engaged in operating, telecasting and broadcasting facilities. Majority of its shares are owned by Pakistan Television Corporation (PTVC), Pakistan Broadcasting Corporation (PBC) and Pakistan National Council of the Arts (PNCA) apart from shares held by the member of entertainment industry. (General Public) The registered office of the Company is situated at Plot No. 36, Sector H-9, Islamabad.

Shalimar Recording & Broadcasting Company Limited is declared as the "National Broadcaster" in terms of Section 2(p) of the PEMRA Ordinance, 2002 along with PBC and PTV.

SRBC is Operating, at present, its TV channel under the call sign " A-TV" and Radio Network "Shalimar FM Radio Network 94.6 MHz".

Channel profile
The channel originally started as People's Television Network (PTN) in 1990 as the first semi-governmental TV Channel and second TV Channel of Pakistan from Islamabad. In 1991 PTN's name was changed to Shalimar TV Network (STN). STN came under PTV Network and was relaunched as Channel-3 in 1999 and with that the channel made its way to the satellite as well. In 2005 name of the channel was changed to ATV as it was relaunched this time under   a joint venture of Shalimar Recording and Broadcasting Company(SRBC). Since 2018 ATV is being operated under Shalimar TV Network of SRBC. ATV now operates with 20 stations covering all major cities and commercial centres of Pakistan.

The ATV stations are located at Islamabad, Karachi, Lahore, Faisalabad, Daska (Gujranwala Division), Multan, Bahawalpur, Larkana, Hyderabad, Sukkur, Peshawar, Mingora, Qalat, Batkhaila, Khuzdar, Thandyani, Sahiwal, Sibi, Quetta and Tando Allahyar covering over 50% of the population.

ATV's role during and after the traumatic Earth Quake experience in 2005 in Pakistan was widely appreciated at home and abroad.

All the capital and running expenses of the company are met from its own resources.

ATV's drama, music, fashion, showbiz, current affairs and agriculture programs are designed to cater to the varying entertainment tastes and information needs of its viewers.

Programming
The program mix of ATV includes entertainment (40%), information (37%) and education (23%).

ATV Shahr-e-Ramadan 
Ramadan Exclusive Transmission

ATV is bringing exclusive transmission

"Shahr-e-Ramadan" for its viewers and advertisers special transmission's segments are as follows; Iftar Transmission Shukrana -e- Naimat. 3:00 PM to 7:00 PM Night transmission Shab -e- Rehmat. 10:00 PM to 12:00 Midnight Sehri Transmission Roshni. 3:00 AM to 5:00 AM

Availability
ATV is available throughout Pakistan, terrestrially (on antenna) and in 86 countries of the world through PakSat 1R. 
ATV can be viewed online at the srbc website.

Current programming

Acquired Serials
Uraan
GT Road
Kaneez
Karam Jali
Dukh Kam Na Honge
Aangan Mein Deewaar
Adhoori Daastan
Dil Mein Raho
Ishq Mein Kaafir
Laal Ishq

Coming Soon 
Mala Mir
Dil Nawaz

Former Programs 
Khuda Gawah
Dil Se Shikayat Hai
Na Janay Kyun
Chaap
Ajnabi Lagey Zindagi
Mujhe Rang De
Emaan
Laal Ishq
Muhabbat Ab Nahi Hogi
Number 1
Muhabbat Yun Bhi Hoti Hai

References

External links
 Shalimar Television Network official website

ATV
Television networks in Pakistan
Urdu-language mass media
Television channels and stations established in 2005
Television stations in Islamabad